Bahrain made its Paralympic Games début the same year as its Olympic début, at the 1984 Summer Paralympics in Stoke Mandeville and New York City, sending a delegation to compete in athletics. The country has participated in every subsequent edition of the Summer Paralympics, but has never taken part in the Winter Paralympics.

Bahraini competitors have won a total of ten Paralympic medals, all of them in athletics: two gold, three silver and five bronze. The country's first inaugural participation in the Games in 1984 yielded two bronze medals: K. Alqatam finished third in the men's javelin (category 5), and Adel Sultan finished third in the men's 100m sprint (category 5). Bahrain won its first gold medal four years later, with Khaled Al Saqer winning the men's slalom in the 1A category. His compatriot Ali Alhasan took bronze in the same event, while Adel Sultan took a silver medal in the 100m sprint (categories 5–6). In 1992, Al Saqer won the country's only medal, a bronze in the discus (THW2-3). There was no medals in 1996, but in 2000 Ayman Al Heddi and Ahmed Kamal obtained a silver and a bronze, respectively, in the discus and the shot put. Ahmed Meshaima's silver in the shot put (F37) in 2004.

Three women have represented Bahrain at the Paralympics: M. Alkhinna and S. Mohamed in sprinting and slalom, Fatema Nedham was the first woman to win a gold medal for Bahrain in the shot put in 2016. Bahraini women's participation in the Paralympics thus predates their participation in the Olympics, which began in 2004.

Medal tallies

Medalists

See also
 Bahrain at the Olympics

References